Some Kind of Hate is the sixth studio album by American rock band Aiden. It was released on October 25, 2011, and is the follow-up to the album Disguises, which was also released in 2011. It is the last album by Aiden released on record label Victory, and is the last album to feature guitarist Angel Ibarra and bassist Nick Wiggins. This album is known for being produced the same year as Disguises, and as the album that finalized their contract with Victory Records and allowing them to be released from the label.

Promotion and release 

One single, "Broken Bones", was released. A short clip of this song was previewed on September 15, 2011 via the Victory Records YouTube profile. On October 8, a full lyric video was released for this song on the same YouTube profile, and later the official music video premiered on YouTube. The video consists of frontman Wil Francis taking a young man on a nightmarish journey through a haunted house.

On October 21, 2011, the band participated in a listening party of the album. It was hosted by Francis on the website Ustream.

The song "There Will Be Blood" was used as the official theme song of Total Nonstop Action Wrestling Pay-per-view Genesis 2012.

Track listing

Personnel 

Aiden
 Wil Francis – vocals, piano, guitars, production, engineering, mixing
 Angel Ibarra – guitars, backing vocals
 Nick Wiggins – bass guitar, backing vocals
 Mike “Ratboy” Novak – drums

Production and additional personnel
 Justin Armstrong – mixing
 Jeremy Beddingfield – backing vocals
 Jake Davison – backing vocals
 Austin Held – backing vocals
 Rick Kern – backing vocals
 Harry Macdonald – backing vocals
 Daniel Matson – backing vocals
 Nicholas McMahan – backing vocals
 Roya Nourani – backing vocals
 Allana Smith – backing vocals
 Jamie Wheelock – backing vocals
 Doublej – layout design
 Aaron Edge – artwork
 Jeremy Saffer – band photo

References 

Victory Records albums
Aiden albums
2011 albums